Kenneth Michael James Fernando is a former Anglican Bishop of Colombo, Sri Lanka.

Born in Moratuwa and educated at Prince of Wales' College, Moratuwa and Royal College, Colombo and at the University of Oxford, he served as the Secretary of the Diocese before he was elected as the Bishop of Colombo. He served as the Vicar of Maharagama Anglican Church prior to his ordination.

See also
Church of Ceylon
Anglican Bishop of Colombo
St Luke's Church, Borella

References

External links
 The Church of Ceylon (Anglican Communion)
 Anglican Church of Ceylon News
 Period in Office as Bishop

20th-century Anglican bishops in Asia
Sinhalese priests
Sri Lankan Anglican bishops
Sri Lankan educational theorists
Sri Lankan chaplains
Anglican chaplains
Alumni of Royal College, Colombo
Alumni of the University of Oxford
Anglican bishops of Colombo
Living people
Sri Lankan expatriates in the United Kingdom
1932 births